In mathematics, the inverse problem for Lagrangian mechanics is the problem of determining whether a given system of ordinary differential equations can arise as the Euler–Lagrange equations for some Lagrangian function.

There has been a great deal of activity in the study of this problem since the early 20th century. A notable advance in this field was a 1941 paper by the American mathematician Jesse Douglas, in which he provided necessary and sufficient conditions for the problem to have a solution; these conditions are now known as the Helmholtz conditions, after the German physicist Hermann von Helmholtz.

Background and statement of the problem

The usual set-up of Lagrangian mechanics on n-dimensional Euclidean space Rn is as follows. Consider a differentiable path u : [0, T] → Rn. The action of the path u, denoted S(u), is given by

where L is a function of time, position and velocity known as the Lagrangian. The principle of least action states that, given an initial state x0 and a final state x1 in Rn, the trajectory that the system determined by L will actually follow must be a minimizer of the action functional S satisfying the boundary conditions u(0) = x0, u(T) = x1. Furthermore, the critical points (and hence minimizers) of S must satisfy the Euler–Lagrange equations for S:

where the upper indices i denote the components of u = (u1, ..., un).

In the classical case

the Euler–Lagrange equations are the second-order ordinary differential equations better known as Newton's laws of motion:

The inverse problem of Lagrangian mechanics is as follows: given a system of second-order ordinary differential equations

that holds for times 0 ≤ t ≤ T, does there exist a Lagrangian L : [0, T] × Rn × Rn → R for which these ordinary differential equations (E) are the Euler–Lagrange equations? In general, this problem is posed not on Euclidean space Rn, but on an n-dimensional manifold M, and the Lagrangian is a function L : [0, T] × TM → R, where TM denotes the tangent bundle of M.

Douglas' theorem and the Helmholtz conditions

To simplify the notation, let

and define a collection of n2 functions Φji by

Theorem. (Douglas 1941) There exists a Lagrangian L : [0, T] × TM → R such that the equations (E) are its Euler–Lagrange equations if and only if there exists a non-singular symmetric matrix g with entries gij depending on both u and v satisfying the following three Helmholtz conditions:

(The Einstein summation convention is in use for the repeated indices.)

Applying Douglas' theorem

At first glance, solving the Helmholtz equations (H1)–(H3) seems to be an extremely difficult task. Condition (H1) is the easiest to solve: it is always possible to find a g that satisfies (H1), and it alone will not imply that the Lagrangian is singular. Equation (H2) is a system of ordinary differential equations: the usual theorems on the existence and uniqueness of solutions to ordinary differential equations imply that it is, in principle, possible to solve (H2). Integration does not yield additional constants but instead first integrals of the system (E), so this step becomes difficult in practice unless (E) has enough explicit first integrals. In certain well-behaved cases (e.g. the geodesic flow for the canonical connection on a Lie group), this condition is satisfied.

The final and most difficult step is to solve equation (H3), called the closure conditions since (H3) is the condition that the differential 1-form gi is a closed form for each i. The reason why this is so daunting is that (H3) constitutes a large system of coupled partial differential equations: for n degrees of freedom, (H3) constitutes a system of

partial differential equations in the 2n independent variables that are the components gij of g, where

denotes the binomial coefficient. In order to construct the most general possible Lagrangian, one must solve this huge system!

Fortunately, there are some auxiliary conditions that can be imposed in order to help in solving the Helmholtz conditions. First, (H1) is a purely algebraic condition on the unknown matrix g. Auxiliary algebraic conditions on g can be given as follows: define functions

Ψjki

by

The auxiliary condition on g is then

In fact, the equations (H2) and (A) are just the first in an infinite hierarchy of similar algebraic conditions. In the case of a parallel connection (such as the canonical connection on a Lie group), the higher order conditions are always satisfied, so only (H2) and (A) are of interest. Note that (A) comprises

conditions whereas (H1) comprises

conditions. Thus, it is possible that (H1) and (A) together imply that the Lagrangian function is singular. As of 2006, there is no general theorem to circumvent this difficulty in arbitrary dimension, although certain special cases have been resolved.

A second avenue of attack is to see whether the system (E) admits a submersion onto a lower-dimensional system and to try to "lift" a Lagrangian for the lower-dimensional system up to the higher-dimensional one. This is not really an attempt to solve the Helmholtz conditions so much as it is an attempt to construct a Lagrangian and then show that its Euler–Lagrange equations are indeed the system (E).

References

 
 

Calculus of variations
Lagrangian mechanics
Inverse problems